Juan Manuel Lozano Mejía (1929–2007) was a Mexican physicist whose area of specialty was classical mechanics. He invented the first commercial jet pack, called "The Rocket Belt"

Biography 
He was born on May 26, 1954 in Puebla, Mexico. He was the inventor of the first commercial "jet pack", called The Rocket Belt, as well as others such as the worlds most powerful rotor tip helicopter, and the fastest rocket powered bicycle. He learned these skills by skipping school and working at garages for race cars as well as science classes when he wasn't skipping school. He was the first to discover how to use hydrogen peroxide to make rocket fuel.

Family 
His mother is Juana Gutierrez Lozano and his father is Felix Lozano. He has a child named Isabel Lozano of whom he created a pink Rocket Belt for.

References

20th-century Mexican physicists
National Autonomous University of Mexico alumni
Academic staff of the National Autonomous University of Mexico
1929 births
2007 deaths